The Palouse to Cascades State Park Trail, formerly known as the John Wayne Pioneer Trail and the Iron Horse Trail, is a rail trail that spans most of the U.S. state of Washington.

The former Milwaukee Road roadbed was acquired by the state of Washington via a quitclaim deed, and is used as a non-motorized recreational trail managed by the Washington State Parks and Recreation Commission and by the Washington State Department of Natural Resources. State legislation "railbanked" the corridor with provisions that allow for the reversion to railroad usage in the future.

History
The trail was originally a railroad line which was decommissioned in 1980. Afterwards, establishing a public right-of-way trail on the land was championed by various people and organizations, especially by Chic Hollenbeck, who founded the John Wayne Pioneer Wagons and Riders Association in the 1980s. Beginning in 1981, Hollenbeck and his organization organized annual horse and wagon rides across Washington along the trail. The organization aimed to fortify the public-ownership of the land, in opposition to nearby private property owners’ extralegal efforts to exert control over the land for their own use. When it was officially established, the eastern part of the trail took on the name "John Wayne Trail" after the organization that lobbied for its existence, themselves being named after actor John Wayne, while the western  portion from Cedar Falls (near North Bend) to the Columbia River south of Vantage was named the "Iron Horse Trail" and had been developed and managed as the Iron Horse State Park.

In 2002, it was designated a National Recreation Trail.

In 2015, two Washington state representatives from the 9th district attempted to include language in an amendment to the state's 2015 capital budget that would close a  section of the trail east of the Columbia River. It was later revealed that a typo, referring to the closed section as "from the Columbia River to the Columbia River", nullified the amendment temporarily.

In April 2018, Washington State Parks proposed renaming the trail and Iron Horse State Park to resolve confusion. Additionally, the name did not conform to the State Parks naming policies. The Washington State Parks and Recreation Commission adopted a new name, the Palouse to Cascades State Park Trail, in May of that year.

In April 2022, the Beverly Railroad Bridge across the Columbia River reopened to provide access for hikers, cyclists, and horse riders following the trail. The railroad trestle, south of Vantage, was renovated at a cost of $5.5 million by the state government. Other sections of the trail in Eastern Washington remain unfinished or in need of replacement.

Trail features

Iron Horse Park access
Access points to the developed portion of the trail, managed by Washington State Parks and Recreation Commission, are at:
 Rattlesnake Lake, Cedar Falls – western terminus and connection to the Snoqualmie Valley Regional Trail
 Twin Falls
 Hyak – provides access to the  Snoqualmie Tunnel through the crest of the Cascade Mountains.  In winter this site provides a public sledding area and ski trails groomed for track and skate style cross country skiing from Hyak eastward.  Washington DOT Sno-pass parking is required at this site in winter.  Within walking/snowing/skiing distance is a state parks owned lodge.
 Easton – descending the eastern slope of the Cascades
 Cle Elum – provides access to the Upper Yakima River Canyon
 Thorp – near the historic Thorp Mill
 Kittitas, Washington – in the open farm valley of the Yakima River drainage east of Ellensburg, Washington
 Army West – at the western edge of the stretch passing through the shrub-steppe country of the U.S. Army's Yakima Training Center
 Army East – at the eastern edge of the stretch passing through the Yakima Training Center as it reaches the Columbia River

Tunnels
The trail features six tunnels, including the longest trail tunnel in the world, the  Snoqualmie Tunnel, which was #50 on the railroad's numbering system. The other five tunnels in order are the Boylston (#45), Thorp (#46), Picnic Area (#47), Easton (#48) and Whittier (#49). The Boylston Tunnel was also known as the Johnson Creek tunnel to the railroad and sometimes tunnels #46 and #47 are known as the Thorp Tunnels.

Undeveloped

Access points to the undeveloped portion of the trail, managed by Washington State Department of Natural Resources, have not been formally opened to the public. However, the trail provides access to the unique geological erosion features of the Channeled Scablands regions of the state of Washington, and several stretches have been recognized as providing access to this area created by the cataclysmic Missoula Floods that swept periodically across eastern Washington and down the Columbia River Plateau during the Pleistocene epoch. At Malden, once home to the largest railroad turntable in the world, Washington State Parks is planning a trailhead in the former rail yard.

References

External links
 Palouse to Cascades Trail Coalition

Rail trails in Washington (state)
State parks of Washington (state)
Chicago, Milwaukee, St. Paul and Pacific Railroad
National Recreation Trails in Washington (state)
Parks in Adams County, Washington
Parks in Grant County, Washington
Parks in King County, Washington
Parks in Kittitas County, Washington
Parks in Spokane County, Washington
Parks in Whitman County, Washington
Transportation in Adams County, Washington
Transportation in Grant County, Washington
Transportation in King County, Washington
Transportation in Kittitas County, Washington
Transportation in Spokane County, Washington
Transportation in Whitman County, Washington